Jacob's Trouble is an American Christian rock band formed in Atlanta in the 1980s. The group's original members were Jerry Davison (drums, lead vocals), Mark Blackburn (guitar, lead vocals), and Steve Atwell (bass). In 1991 they added Ron Cochran (drums) and Keith Johnston (guitar).

Biography

In 1988 Jacob's Trouble formed and released an independent EP, Jacob's Trouble.

In 1989, Jacob's Trouble released their debut album which was produced by Terry Taylor, Door into Summer. It is a mixture of original numbers and cover versions of songs by the Beatles and the Monkees.

A year later the band released their second album, Knock, Breathe, Shine. The band received notice at the time for the song "About Sex", a song about the proper role of sex in society from a Christian perspective. Fearing a fundamentalist label, the band opted to remove the song from the album and replaced it with the more ambiguous "About Sex, Part 2". Despite this, the album was the group's bestselling record. Prior to touring while promoting Knock Breathe Shine, the group added Ron Cochran on drums and guitarist Keith Johnston, allowing Davison to become the band's principal singer. One of their songs, "These Thousand Hills", was given much wider exposure when Third Day performed a cover of the song on their album Offerings.

In 1992 Jacob's Trouble released the album ...let the truth run wild! with producer Mark Heard. Near the end of the tour for ...let the truth run wild Blackburn left the band.

The band went on to record one more record, the self-titled and self-produced Jacob's Trouble. The band split after their fourth album and its subsequent tour. Diggin' Up Bones, a collection of "rarities", was released in 1994 and included the song, "About Sex". The group reunited briefly in 1998 to record "Step by Step" for The Jacob's Trouble Sampler Pak compilation album.

Jerry Davison recorded the album Uberpop! under the name sideways8 in 1998 and in the early 2000s occasionally released songs digitally. He currently resides in Uganda; he and his wife serve as Family Mentors at The Amazima School.

Mark Blackburn released two solo albums, Flowerchild (1996) and The Continuing Adventures of.... (1997). Blackburn is pastor of a church, Silver Comet Baptist Church, in his hometown of Dallas, Georgia.

In 2014 the original three members, Davison, Blackburn, and Atwell, played two reunion concerts in Dallas, Georgia for the 25th anniversary of Door into Summer. They were joined by Nathan Blackburn and Erik Davison, sons of Mark and Jerry respectively, as well as Darryl Johnson, all of whom provided additional instrumentation. They performed the album in its entirety for the first time along with some selections from Knock Breathe Shine, and two covers. A bootleg of the show received a limited digital and CD release.

On March 21, 2021, the band announced their revival and new live project, The Cavern Sessions, which would be released one track at a time on their YouTube channel with plans for a possible digital release upon the projects completion.

Members 

Current
 Jerry Davison – vocals (1988–1994, 2021–present)
 Steve Atwell  – bass guitar (1988–1994, 2021–present)
 Ron Cochran – drums (1991–1994, 2021–present)
 Keith Johnston – guitar, percussion (1991–1994, 2021–present)

Former
 Mark Blackburn – guitar (1988–1992)

Touring musicians
 Matt Goldman – drums (1990)

Discography

Studio albums 
 Door into Summer (Aug. 1989)
 Knock, Breathe, Shine (Aug. 1990)
 ...let the Truth Run Wild!  (March 1992)
 Jacob's Trouble (May 1993)

Compilation albums 

Diggin' Up Bones (1994)
 The Jacob's Trouble Sampler Pak (1998)

Live 

 25LIVE: Door into Summer 25th Anniversary Concert (2014)

EPs 

 Jacob's Trouble (1988)
 The Cavern Sessions (live EP) (TBA 2022)

Reissues

 Jacob's Trouble / ...let the Truth Run Wild!  (1998) Double Album released by KMG
 Knock, Breathe, Shine / Door into Summer (2000) Double Album released by KMG

Singles 

 "Church of Do-What-You-Want-To" (1989)
 "Waiting for the Son" (1989)
 "Million Miles" (1989)
 "Psalms 151" (1989)
 "Look at You Now" (1990)
 "There Goes My Heart Again" (1990)
 "Islands, Buildings and Freeways" (1990)
 "Further Up and Further In" (1990)
 "Something Good Happens" (1992)
 "Morning Light" (1992)
 "Walls of Doubt" (1992)
 "I'd Rather Have Jesus" (1992)
 "Hope to See You There" (1992)
 "Wild Wild Ride" (1993)
 "Lovehouse" (1993)
 "Better Days" (1993)
 "This Moment" (1993)

References

External links
 Official Blog for Jacob's Trouble by Jerry Davison 
 Official Youtube

Christian rock groups from Georgia (U.S. state)
Musical groups from Atlanta
Musical groups established in 1989